Badminton competition at the 2010 Summer Youth Olympics was held from August 15 to August 19, 2010 at the Singapore Indoor Stadium.

Format and schedule
32 players from each event were drawn into eight groups. Of the eight groups, only the group winner of each group advanced into the knockout stage, starting with the quarterfinals. The group stage were played from August 15–16, 2010, while the knockput stage were played from August 17–19, 2010.

Qualification
Only players born between January 1, 1992, and December 31, 1993, are eligible to participate. Highest ranked men and women (one per National Olympic Committee) qualify according to continental quotas at youth continental championships or based on continental ranking list (Two quotas each for Africa, America and Oceania, while five quotas each for Asia and Europe). If there was no continental championships held, that continent will select the players via ranking itself as of May 1, 2010. The remaining seven places will be selected through the 2010 World Junior Championships ranking list. For the host country, they may fill one highest ranked player in each event.

Qualifiers
As of July 21, 2010.

Boys

Asia

Europe

Pan Am

Oceania

Africa

World Junior Championships

Universality

Host

Girls

Asia

Europe

Pan Am

Oceania

Africa

World Junior Championships

Universality

Medal summary

Medal table

Events

Boys' event

Girls' event

References

External links
Badminton Event at the 2010 Summer Youth Olympics

 
2010 Summer Youth Olympics events
Badminton tournaments in Singapore
2010
Summer Youth Olympics